TPC Stonebrae, formerly TPC San Francisco Bay, is an American links style golf course and private golf club located at Stonebrae Country Club in the hills above Hayward, California on the eastern side of the San Francisco Bay Area. TPC Stonebrae Country Club is currently the newest Country Club in the San Francisco Bay Area and has a top 10 course rating in Northern California.

Stonebrae Country Club opened in 2007. The following year, the David McLay Kidd designed championship golf course became part of the Tournament Players Club network operated by the PGA Tour and was rebranded as the TPC San Francisco Bay and then the TPC Stonebrae. It is owned and operated by YCS Investments, an investment company of the family behind King Fook Holdings.

Upon opening in 2007, TPC Stonebrae has received the following awards: "Northern California’s Best New Course" (LINKS Magazine, 2007), "One of the Best New Golf Courses" (Travel + Leisure Golf, 2007), "6th Best New Private Course in America"  (Golf Digest, 2008), 2015 National Private Course Winner for Environmental Leaders in Golf Awards (ELGA) presented by Golf Digest, Merit Winner for Private Facility – 2007, 2008, 2009, 2010, 2011, 2013, 2014, 2015, 2016 (Environmental Leaders in Golf Awards (ELGA)).

From 2008 until 2019, TPC Stonebrae was the host venue for the variously named Ellie Mae Classic at TPC Stonebrae, a tournament on the Korn Ferry Tour.  The event was not held in 2013 due to the construction of a new clubhouse.

In 2014 the club opened a new 32,000 sq. foot Clubhouse that was named as 2014's "2nd Best New Clubhouse in the World" by Golf INC Magazine.

In 2016 at the Ellie Mae Classic at TPC Stonebrae, Stephan Jaeger set the 18 hole scoring record of 58 at a PGA Tour sanctioned event in the first round of the Ellie Mae Classic and the lowest 72 Hole Tournament aggregate score in history at a PGA Tour sanctioned event.

in 2017 at the Ellie Mae Classic at TPC Stonebrae, Stephen Curry of the Golden State Warriors, received a Sponsors Exemption into the Tournament.  During his professional golf debut, Stephen Curry recorded first and second round scores of 74.  Curry returned to play in the 2018 event, again missing the cut with scores of 71-86.

Scorecard

References

External links

Golf clubs and courses in California
Sports in Hayward, California
Tourist attractions in Alameda County, California
Sports venues completed in 2007
2007 establishments in California